Justin Stoddart (born 3 November 1995) is a Canadian professional soccer player who plays as a midfielder.

Club career

Sigma FC
In 2016, Stoddart played for Sigma FC in League1 Ontario, scoring seven goals in nineteen appearances. The following year, he made thirteen appearances for Sigma, scoring four goals. In 2018, Stoddart made fourteen league appearances, scoring two goals, and made another three appearances in the League1 Ontario playoffs. In 2019, Stoddart scored six goals in fifteen league appearances and made another two appearances in the playoffs.

Forge FC
On 15 September 2019, Stoddart signed his first professional contract with Canadian Premier League side Forge FC. On 6 October 2019, he made his only appearance with Forge, entering in the 76th minute as a substitute in a 1–0 win over York9 FC. On 8 January 2020, the club announced Stoddart would not return for the 2020 season.

References

External links

1995 births
Living people
Association football midfielders
Canadian soccer players
Canadian expatriate soccer players
Expatriate soccer players in the United States
Canadian expatriate sportspeople in the United States
Temple Owls men's soccer players
Oakland Golden Grizzlies men's soccer players
Forge FC players
League1 Ontario players
Canadian Premier League players
Sigma FC players
Soccer players from Brampton